Shaun Mark Spiers (born 23 April 1962) is the Executive Director of the environmental think-tank, Green Alliance and a former Member of the European Parliament.

Biography
He was educated at Brentwood School, read PPE at St John's College, Oxford and later took a master's degree in War Studies from King's College London writing Tom Wintringham and the Socialist Way of War for the Institute of Historical Research in 1988, a paper which led to Wintringham's papers coming to King's, and formed the basis for much of Wintringham's biography as eventually written by Hugh Purcell. A keen cooperator, he served as Political Officer of the South East Co-op (Co-operative Wholesale Society) from 1987 to 1994. In 1994 he was elected Labour MEP for London South East. He served on the Agriculture and Rural Development committee. He was not re-elected in 1999 under the list system, and became Chief Executive of the Association of British Credit Unions Limited (ABCUL) which represents the vast majority of credit unions in Great Britain. Spiers was Chief Executive of CPRE 2004 to 2017. 

His book, 'How to build houses and save the countryside', was published by Policy Press in March 2018.

References

1962 births
Living people
People educated at Brentwood School, Essex
Alumni of St John's College, Oxford
Alumni of King's College London
Labour Party (UK) MEPs
Co-operative Party politicians
British charity and campaign group workers
MEPs for England 1994–1999